Schiemann is a surname. Notable people with the surname include:

Elisabeth Schiemann (1881–1972), German geneticist, crop researcher and resistance fighter in the Third Reich
Konrad Schiemann, PC (born 1937), British barrister and judge
Paul Schiemann (1876–1944), Baltic German journalist, editor and politician known for his commitment to minority rights
Peter Schiemann (c.1980–2005), police officer killed in the Mayerthorpe tragedy on March 3, 2005 in the Canadian province of Alberta

See also
Balz-Schiemann reaction, converts a primary aromatic amine to an aryl fluoride via a diazonium tetrafluorofluoroborate intermediate
Scheidemann